Dizan (also Romanized as Dīzān; also known as Tezān) is a village in Dashtabi-ye Gharbi Rural District, Dashtabi District, Buin Zahra County, Qazvin Province, Iran. At the 2006 census, its population was 393, in 102 families.
The family of Darvish Hosseini is one of the first and oldest residents of this village and the majority of the villagers's income is from raisin production.

References 

Populated places in Buin Zahra County